The Google Chart API is an interactive Web service (now deprecated) that creates graphical charts from user-supplied data. Google servers create a PNG image of a chart from data and formatting parameters specified by a user's HTTP request. The service supports a wide variety of chart information and formatting. Users may conveniently embed these charts in a Web page by using a simple image tag.

Originally the API was Google's internal tool to support rapid embedding of charts within Google's own applications (like Google Finance for example). Google figured it would be a useful tool to open up to web developers. It officially launched on December 6, 2007.

Currently, line, bar, pie, and radar charts, as well as Venn diagrams, scatter plots, sparklines, maps, google-o-meters, and QR codes are supported.

Google deprecated the API in 2012 with guaranteed availability until April 2015. On March 18, 2019 Google turned off the API. Google recommends the successor service Google Charts.

Example 

The following URL creates the pie chart below:
http://chart.apis.google.com/chart?chs=200x200&chdlp=b&chtt=Uberman&chdl=Asleep|Aw&chd=t:11,11,11,11,11,11,11,11,11,11,11,11&cht=p&chco=586F8E,red,586F8E,7D858F,586F8E,7D858F,586F8E,7D858F,586F8E,7D858F,586F8E,7D858F

External Libraries 

Instead of creating the URL request manually, there are many open source libraries available for most programming languages.

See also
 Comparison of JavaScript charting frameworks
 List of information graphics software

References

External links 
Google Chart API

Chart API
Visualization API